The Seattle Mariners 2002 season was their 26th since the franchise creation. After their record 116 wins the previous year without a World Series appearance, they attempted for a third straight postseason appearance. They ended the season , but finished 3rd in the American League West and missed the postseason. This season began a playoff drought that lasted for 20 seasons until 2022, at which point it was the longest in all of the four North American professional sports.

Offseason
December 7, 2001: Bret Boone was signed as a free agent with the Seattle Mariners.
December 19, 2001: David Bell was signed as a free agent with the Seattle Mariners.
January 25, 2002: David Bell was traded by the Seattle Mariners to the San Francisco Giants for Desi Relaford and cash.

Regular season
On May 2, 2002, Mike Cameron hit four home runs in one game versus the White Sox.

Opening Day starters
Bret Boone
Mike Cameron
Jeff Cirillo
Freddy Garcia
Carlos Guillén
Edgar Martínez
Mark McLemore
John Olerud
Ichiro Suzuki
Dan Wilson

Season standings

American League Wild Card

Record vs. opponents

Roster

Player stats

Batting

Starters by position
Note: Pos = Position; G = Games played; AB = At bats; H = Hits; Avg. = Batting average; HR = Home runs; RBI = Runs batted in

Other batters
Note: G = Games played; AB = At bats; H = Hits; Avg. = Batting average; HR = Home runs; RBI = Runs batted in

Pitching

Starting pitchers
Note: G = Games pitched; IP = Innings pitched; W = Wins; L = Losses; ERA = Earned run average; SO = Strikeouts

Other pitchers
Note: G = Games pitched; IP = Innings pitched; W = Wins; L = Losses; ERA = Earned run average; SO = Strikeouts

Relief pitchers
Note: G = Games pitched; W = Wins; L = Losses; SV = Saves; ERA = Earned run average; SO = Strikeouts

Farm system

LEAGUE CHAMPIONS: San Antonio

Major League Baseball Draft

The following is a list of 2002 Seattle Mariners draft picks. The Mariners took part in the June regular draft, also known as the Rule 4 draft. The Mariners made 50 selections in the 2002 draft, the first being outfielder John Mayberry, Jr. in the first round. In all, the Mariners selected 23 pitchers, 12 outfielders, 5 catchers, 3 second basemen, 3 shortstops, 3 third basemen, 3 second basemen, and 1 first baseman.

Draft

Key

Table

References

External links

2002 Seattle Mariners at Baseball Reference
2002 Seattle Mariners at Baseball Almanac

Seattle Mariners seasons
2002 in sports in Washington (state)
Seattle Mariners season